Jiří Feureisl (3 October 1931 – 12 May 2021) was a Czechoslovak football forward who played for Czechoslovakia in the 1958 FIFA World Cup, scoring a goal in the 6–1 win over Argentina., and the 1955-60 Central European International Cup, which Czechoslovakia national team won, with him being his teams joint top scorer.

At club level, he played for Dynamo Karlovy Vary.

Feureisl died on 12 May 2021, aged 89.

International 
Czechoslovakia
 Central European International Cup: 1955-60

References

External links
 
 FIFA profile

1931 births
2021 deaths
Czech footballers
Czechoslovak footballers
Czechoslovakia international footballers
Association football forwards
1958 FIFA World Cup players
People from Rokycany District
Sportspeople from the Plzeň Region